Mokone Marabe is a Mosotho footballer who plays as a striker for Bantu FC. Since 2008, he has won four caps for the Lesotho national football team.

References

External links
 

Living people
Association football forwards
Lesotho footballers
Lesotho international footballers
1990 births